The name Babs has been used for four tropical cyclones in the northwest Pacific Ocean.

 Typhoon Babs (1951) (T5121)
 Typhoon Babs (1956) (T5609), struck Japan
 Tropical Storm Babs (1959) (T5917, 41W), struck Taiwan
 Typhoon Babs (1998) (T9811, 20W, Loleng), Category 4 super typhoon; struck the Philippines, resulting in 156 deaths and heavy flooding

Pacific typhoon set index articles